Oppenheim is a town in the Mainz-Bingen district of Rhineland-Palatinate, Germany. The town is a well-known wine center, being the home of the German Winegrowing Museum, and is particularly known for the wines from the Oppenheimer Krötenbrunnen vineyards.

Geography

Location 
The town lies on the Upper Rhine in Rhenish Hesse between Mainz and Worms. It is the seat of the Verbandsgemeinde (special administrative district).

History 
In 765, the first documented mention of the Frankish village was recorded in the Lorsch Codex, in connection with an endowment by Charlemagne to the Lorsch Abbey. Further portions of Oppenheim were added to the endowment in 774. In 1008, Oppenheim was granted market rights. In October 1076 Oppenheim gained special importance in the Investiture Controversy. At the princely session of Trebur and Oppenheim, the princes called on King Henry IV to undertake the "Walk to Canossa". After Oppenheim was returned to the Empire in 1147, it became a Free Imperial City in 1225, during the Staufer Emperor Frederick II's. At this time, the town was important for its imperial castle and the Burgmannen who lived there.

In the 14th century, the town was pledged to the Electorate of Mainz and beginning in 1398, it belonged to the territory of the Electoral Palatinate.

In 1621, the Oppenheim town chronicle reports a great fire in which the Oppenheim Town Hall was almost completely destroyed. The Electoral Oberamt archive, too, was lost in the fire, and so it was moved to Mainz. [the meaning here is not clear]

On 14 September 1620, Spanish troops overran the town in the Thirty Years' War. The Spaniards occupied Oppenheim until 1632. In 1688, French troops overran the town in the Nine Years' War (1688–1697). On 31 May 1689, Landskrone Castle and the town were utterly destroyed by the French under General Mélac. Until 1797, Oppenheim remained an Electoral Palatinate holding. After being in French hands, Oppenheim passed, in 1816, to the Grand Duchy of Hesse-Darmstadt. It remained Hessian until 1945.

In March 1945, troops of the 3rd Army under General George S. Patton managed to build a crossing over the Rhine near Oppenheim and to occupy it.

Politics

Town partnerships 
 Givry, Saône-et-Loire, France
 Adnet, Salzburg, Austria
 Werder, Potsdam-Mittelmark, Brandenburg
 Calp, Alicante, Spain
 Sant'Ambrogio di Valpolicella, Province of Verona, Veneto, Italy

Coat of arms 
The town's arms might be described thus: Or an eagle displayed sable.

All town seals up until 1925 showed a crowned king's head, but for one, from 1266, that showed the Emperor on his throne. Nevertheless, the town adopted arms with this composition while still using the king's head seal. The arms have not changed since their adoption.

The arms have been borne since 1609.

Wine sponsorship 
In Oppenheim, wine was given considerable publicity by Mayor Dr. Heinz Scheller after he took office in 1935: For Scheller, the only city worthy of sponsoring Oppehneim's wine was none other than the capital, Berlin. The town of Ansbach and the city of Osnabrück were also subsequently chosen. To revive this wine sponsorship and to give thanks for the commitment to the town of Oppenheim, the Governing Mayor of  Berlin, Klaus Wowereit, was “knighted” on 11 March 2006 by Mayor Marcus Held, earning the title of "Wine Knight" (Weinritter).

The sponsorship has found active expression in, among other things, the town's participation in the estate festivals held by the Senate of Berlin in 2007 and 2008. At the invitation of Berlin's governing mayor, Klaus Wowereit, a citizens’ delegation, under Mayor Marcus Held, took part in the festivities at the German Embassy in Paris on German Unity Day, as well as during the jubilee celebrations of the Berlin-Paris city partnership.

Culture and sightseeing

Worth seeing are:
 Katharinenkirche, with the stained glass (the "Oppenheim Rose"), is the most outstanding Gothic church on the Rhine between the Cologne Cathedral and the Strasbourg Cathedral.
 Landskron Castle's ruins, with a lovely view over the Rhine rift and other church buildings in Oppenheim, also a venue for festival plays and other cultural events.
 The old town with its marketplace, town hall from 1621 (with a column from Landskron Castle's hall in front, which reputedly came from the Ingelheim Imperial Palace), the former town fortifications with the Gautor and Rheintorpforte (gates), clocktower and town wall remnants, and unique museums (German Viticultural Museum, Town Museum).

Quite extraordinary is the Oppenheimer Kellerlabyrinth (“Oppenheim Cellar Labyrinth”) under the Old Town. Underground passageways, stairways and rooms link the houses and facilities with each other on a number of levels. In the heart of Old Town, near the Town Hall, there are altogether roughly 650 m of cellar passageways open to visitors, which are largely preserved in their original state. It is believed, however, that what has been opened to the public is only about 3% of the total underground passages. The exact extent of the passageways is still not known with any great certainty, despite investigations commissioned by the town, but the length is estimated to be at least 40 km. Guided tours through this unique underground labyrinth are offered all year round by the town's Tourism and Festival Play Bureau. There are also town tours and night watchman tours.

Theatre 
Annually, between August and October, the Oppenheimer Theaterfestspiele (“Oppenheim Theatre Festival Plays”) take place in the town's Kulturkeller (“Culture Cellar”) and at Landskron Castle's ruins.

Museums 
Particularly worth visiting, besides Saint Katherine's Church, the Town Museum and the underground labyrinth, is the German Viticultural Museum (Deutsches Weinbaumuseum) with the region's oldest wine press from the Geistermühle, a centuries-old mill in Flonheim. Everything worth knowing about wine can be found here.

Music 
In the Kultursommer (“Cultural Summer”), there are regular concerts in the town's historic marketplace in front of the Town Hall.  The Oppenheim Trombone Choir also gives regular performances.

Sport 
There are several sport clubs in Oppenheim, e.g., TC Rot-Weiß Oppenheim (Red-White Tennis Club) (tennis), FSV Oppenheim (Football Sport-Verein) (football), and one founded in 1846 that may well have the most members, TV Oppenheim. TV (Turn-Verein= gymnastics and sports association) Oppenheim is successful well beyond its home region in gymnastics, swimming, cycling sports and above all, basketball.

Regular events 
Each year in the town at Landskron Castle's ruins, Saint Katherine's Church, the Kulturkeller under the courthouse square and the marketplace, the Festspiele Oppenheim (“Oppenheim Festival Plays”) take place.

An Easter Market also takes place annually early in the year and later in the year, the Saint Katherine's Market in the Old Town.

Other regular events in town are:
The Easter Artists’ Market (Osterkünstlermarkt), a fortnight before Easter;
The well-known and well-loved Oppenheim Wine Festival (Oppenheimer Weinfest) during the second weekend of August;
Mittelalterspectaculum (“Mediaeval Spectacle”) in early May;
Rhine Bicycle Ride between Worms and Oppenheim in mid-May;
Fairytale Christmas Market (Märchenweihnachtsmarkt) at the historic Town Hall, Saint Katherine's Church and the marketplace on the third Sunday of Advent.

Economy and infrastructure

Public institutions 
The administration of the Verbandsgemeinde of Nierstein-Oppenheim is based in Oppenheim.

The State Office for Environment, Water Management and Trade Control, the Mannheim Water and Shipping Office and Mainz-Bingen District Vehicle Licensing are all located town.

Education 
Besides three kindergarten institutions or kindergartens (of which two are municipal daycare centres), there is the “Am Gautor” primary school.

Oppenheim also has the Gymnasium zu St. Katharinen, the Professional School for Winegrowing and Agrarian Sciences, the Matthäus-Merian-Hauptschule and the Landskronschule, a special school.

Media 
Appearing in Oppenheim is the Allgemeine Zeitung, with local reporting and its own offices. Furthermore, there is the weekly Rheinhessisches Wochenblatt, likewise published by the Verlagsgruppe Rhein Main.

Transport 
Oppenheim lies on Bundesstraße (Highway) 9, which leads from the Dutch border near Kleve to the French border near Kandel. Locally it serves foremost as a link to the nearby cities of Mainz and Worms and the Mainzer Autobahnring in the north and A 6 in the south.

Linking Oppenheim to rail transport is a railway station on the Mainz-Ludwigshafen line. Running on it is the RB 44 Mainz-Worms-Ludwigshafen-Mannheim. Furthermore, ORN regional bus routes run from Dalheim to Wörrstadt by way of Oppenheim and towards Guntersblum and Undenheim.

Famous people 

 Johann von Dalberg (1455–1503), 1480 cathedral provost in Worms and Chancellor of the University of Heidelberg, 1482 Chancellor of Elector Philipp of the Palatinate, 1482 Bishop of Worms, made Heidelberg and Worms into the then centres of humanism.
  (1481–1523), Imperial herald, guided Martin Luther in 1521 on his way to the Diet of Worms and back.
 Johann Paulsackel (1805–1855), champion of democratic freedom rights.
 Paul Wallot (1841–1912), German architect, builder of the Reichstag building in Berlin.
 Johanna Senfter (1879–1961), outstanding composer of the 20th century
 James Benjamin Oppenheim (1979) entrepreneur
 Carl Wilhelm Witterstätter (1884–1964), aviation pioneer.
 Jakob Steffan (1888–1957), Sozial Democratic politician, beginning in 1933 arrested several times, organized the civil anti-Nazi resistance in South Hesse and Rhenish Hesse, (1946–1950) Interior and Social Minister of Rhineland-Palatinate.
 Paul Witterstätter (1892–1966), expressionist (later realist) painter.
 Susanne Völker (b. 1974), German Wine Queen, 1998/1999

People who have worked here 

 Madern Gerthener (b. about 1360; d. 1430), City master builder of the Free Imperial City of Frankfurt am Main, sculptor and one of the most important artists of the Late Gothic on the Middle Rhine, created the west quire at Saint Catherine's Church, beginning in 1414
 Johannes Pauli (b. 1450/54; d. after 1530), Franciscan friar, Schwank poet, trailblazer for the comic, pointed short story (Fazetie) in Early Renaissance Germany (1499 preacher at the Oppenheim Franciscan convent).
 Jakob Köbel (1460–1535), beginning in 1494 active in Oppenheim as town clerk (chancellery chairman), book printer, publisher, important (mathematical) writer, member of the humanistic association Sodalitas litteraria Rhenana and hospes of the Oppenheim section.
 Anton Praetorius (1560–1613), clergyman in Oppenheim (1589–1592), fighter against witch trials and torture.
 Johann Theodor de Bry (1561–1623), worked from 1609 to 1619 as publisher and copper engraver in Oppenheim, which was sympathetic to Calvinistic religious refugees. speciality: the richly illustrated scientific book. 1617 Matthäus Merian's father-in-law.
 Hieronymus Galler, printer from Basel, left Frankfurt with Johann Theodor de Bry in 1609 and from 1610 to 1620 ran a highly productive printshop in Oppenheim.
 Albert Molnár (1574–1634), reformed theologian and itinerant academic from Hungary, from 1615 to 1619 cantor and rector of the Latin school in Oppenheim.
 Matthäus Merian  (1593–1650), worked from 1616 to 1619 as copper engraver in Oppenheim.
 Friedrich Koch (1786–1865), apothecary, inventor of industrial quinine manufacture.
 Carl Koch (1833–1910), pharmaceutical manufacturer, winery owner, mayor, member of the second chamber of the Hessian Landstände, honorary citizen, Patriarch with social conscience, Friedrich Koch's son.

References

External links 

  
 Vineyards in Oppenheim
 German Viticultural Museum
 Jewish Encyclopedia

Mainz-Bingen
Rhenish Hesse